Lee Eun-mi (born 18 August 1988) is a South Korean footballer who plays as a defender for Suwon FC and the South Korea national team.

Club career
In 2018, Lee joined Suwon UDC. On 23 April 2018, she mede her debut in a 1–0 victory against Changnyeong.

References

External links

Lee Eun-mi at the Korea Football Association (KFA)
Lee Eun-mi at the Korea Women's Football Federation (KWFF)

1988 births
Living people
South Korean women's footballers
South Korea women's international footballers
2015 FIFA Women's World Cup players
WK League players
Women's association football defenders
Footballers at the 2010 Asian Games
Footballers at the 2018 Asian Games
Asian Games bronze medalists for South Korea
Asian Games medalists in football
Medalists at the 2010 Asian Games
Medalists at the 2018 Asian Games
Universiade gold medalists for South Korea
Universiade medalists in football
2019 FIFA Women's World Cup players
Medalists at the 2009 Summer Universiade
21st-century South Korean women